Mosimann is a surname. Notable people with the surname include:

Anton Mosimann (born 1947), Swiss chef and restaurateur
Quentin Mosimann (born 1988), Swiss DJ and record producer
Roli Mosimann, Swiss musician and record producer
Thomas Mosimann, Swiss slalom canoeist

See also
Billie Sue Mosiman (1947–2018), American author
Mary Mosiman (born 1962), American politician